Heeger is a surname. Notable people with the surname include:

Alan J. Heeger (born 1936), American physicist
David Heeger (born 1961), American neuroscientist
Ernst Heeger (1783–1866), Austrian amateur entomologist
Gerald Heeger (born 1942), American academic and college administrator

See also
Heeter